The 1954 United States Senate election in Rhode Island took place on November 2, 1954. Incumbent Democratic U.S. Senator Theodore F. Green was re-elected to a fourth term in office.

Primary elections 
The Democratic primary was held on September 20, 1954, and the Republican primary was held on September 29, 1954.

Democratic primary

Candidate 
Theodore F. Green, incumbent U.S. Senator

Results

Republican primary

Candidates 
Walter I. Sundlun, attorney

Results

General election

Results

References

Bibliography
 
 

Rhode Island
1954
United States Senate